Panoquina panoquinoides, known generally as the obscure skipper or beach skipper, is a species of grass skipper in the butterfly family Hesperiidae. It is found in the Caribbean Sea, North America, and South America.

The MONA or Hodges number for Panoquina panoquinoides is 4117.

Subspecies
These four subspecies belong to the species Panoquina panoquinoides:
 Panoquina panoquinoides calna Evans, 1955
 Panoquina panoquinoides eugeon Godman & Salvin, 1896
 Panoquina panoquinoides minima de Jong, 1983
 Panoquina panoquinoides panoquinoides (Skinner, 1891)

References

Further reading

 

Panoquina
Articles created by Qbugbot
Butterflies described in 1891